Pamela R. "Pam" Lynch is a Canadian politician, who was elected to the Legislative Assembly of New Brunswick in the 2010 provincial election, defeating Liberal cabinet minister Kelly Lamrock. She represented the electoral district of Fredericton-Fort Nashwaak from 2010 to 2014, and represented the new district of Fredericton-Grand Lake from 2014 until 2018, as a member of the Progressive Conservatives.

Lynch was named to the Select Committee on Cannabis, pursuant to Motion 31 of the 3rd session of the 58th New Brunswick Legislature.

References

Politicians from Fredericton
Progressive Conservative Party of New Brunswick MLAs
Women MLAs in New Brunswick
Living people
21st-century Canadian politicians
21st-century Canadian women politicians
Year of birth missing (living people)